IN-1, IN 1, or IN1 may refer to:

 Indiana's 1st congressional district
 Indiana State Road 1

See also